is a district of Shibuya, Tokyo, Japan.

As of October 2020, the population of this district is 8,629. The postal code for Hatsudai is 151-0061.

An Awa Odori festival is held here annually.

Geography
Hatsudai borders Nishi-Shinjuku and Honmachi in the north, Yoyogi to the east, Nishihara to the south and southwest, and Motoyoyogichō to the west.

Demography

Transportation
Hatsudai is served by Hatsudai Station, on the Keiō New Line.

Education
 operates public elementary and junior high schools.

All of Hatsudai (1 and 2-chome) is zoned to Hatashiro Elementary School (幡代小学校), and Yoyogi Junior High School (代々木中学校).

Schools in Hatsudai include:
 Hatashiro Elementary School (渋谷区立幡代小学校) (Hatsudai 1-32-12)

References

Neighborhoods of Tokyo
Shibuya